John Ellis  ( – 15 October 1776) aka Jean Ellis was a British linen merchant and naturalist. Ellis was the first to have a published written description of the Venus flytrap and its botanical name. 

Ellis specialised in the study of corals. He was elected a member of the Royal Society in 1754 and in the following year published An essay towards the Natural History of the Corallines. He was awarded the Copley Medal in 1767. He was elected to the American Philosophical Society in 1774. His A Natural History of Many Uncommon and Curious Zoophytes, written with Daniel Solander, was published posthumously in 1776.

Ellis was appointed Royal Agent for British West Florida in 1764, and for British Dominica in 1770.

He exported many seeds and native plants from North America to England. He corresponded with many botanists, including Carl Linnaeus.

Taxonomist

Venus's Fly-trap
A royal botanist, William Young imported living plants of the Venus flytrap to England. They were then shown to Ellis. In 1769, he wrote a description of the plant discovery from North Carolina to send to the 'Father of Taxonomy', Carl Linnaeus.
Ellis also gave it the scientific name of Dionaea muscipula. Later, his essay Directions for bringing over seeds and plants, from the East Indies (1770) included the first illustration of a Venus Flytrap plant.

Honours
He was honoured by having 2 plant genera named after him, Ellisia (in 1763 ) and Ellisiophyllum (in 1871).

See also
Arthur Dobbs
Peter Collinson

References

External links

 Ellis, John (1773) Directions for bringing over seeds and plants, from the East-Indies and other distant countries - digital facsimile from Linda Hall Library
 

English botanists
Botanical illustrators
English zoologists
Plant collectors
1710 births
1776 deaths
Botanists active in North America
Botanists active in the Caribbean
Fellows of the Royal Society
Recipients of the Copley Medal
British Dominica people
West Florida
18th-century British botanists
18th-century English businesspeople
18th-century British zoologists
Members of the American Philosophical Society